Intercontinental Bank plc, commonly referred to as Intercontinental Bank or simply Intercontinental, is a commercial bank in Nigeria. It is now owned by Access Bank plc.  Intercontinental Bank is one of the twenty-four commercial banks licensed by the Central Bank of Nigeria, the country's banking regulator.

Overview
Intercontinental Bank was a large financial services provider in West Africa.  the bank's shareholder's equity was valued at approximately US$1.7 billion (NGN:261 billion). The shares of stock of Intercontinental Bank are listed on the Nigerian Stock Exchange (NSE), where they trade under the symbol: INTERCONT.

History
The bank was established in 1989 under the name Nigerian Intercontinental Merchant Bank Limited. That same year, the first subsidiary, Intercontinental Securities Limited, was established. In 1996, the bank acquired controlling shareholding in Equity Bank of Nigeria, a commercial bank. Also is 1996, Intercontinental acquired majority shareholding in West African Provincial Company plc (WAPIC), an insurance company. Intercontinental converted into a commercial bank in 1999. In 2002, the company listed its shares on the Nigerian Stock Exchange.
In 2005, Intercontinental successfully merged with three other commercial banks, in which it held equity positions prior to the merger, namely Equity Bank of Nigeria, Gateway Bank and Global Bank.

In 2009, a special audit of the commercial banks in Nigeria by the Central Bank of Nigeria, the country's banking regulator, found nine of the banks to be under-capitalized and badly managed. Intercontinental Bank Plc. was one of the troubled banks. Following the injection of capital by the Federal Government of Nigeria, to maintain solvency, the troubled banks have embarked on re-capitalization through participation by new investors, yet to be made public.

In 2011, Access Bank began talks with the Central Bank of Nigeria to acquire Intercontinental Bank. Further to the approval of the shareholders of Intercontinental bank and Access Bank, court sanction of the Federal High Court of Nigeria and approval of the Central Bank of Nigeria and the Securities & Exchange Commission, Access Bank plc completed recapitalization of Intercontinental Bank and the acquisition of 75% majority interest in Intercontinental Bank. In effect, Intercontinental Bank (including all its assets, liabilities and undertakings) became a subsidiary of Access Bank plc. Aluko & Oyebode acted as Transaction Counsel to Access Bank plc in connection with its acquisition of Intercontinental Bank plc.

In 2013, Intercontinental Bank merged with Access Bank, thereby incorporating intercontinental bank and all its assets to Access Bank plc.

Subsidiaries
The bank had the following subsidiary companies, as of December 2010: Together with the parent bank, they sometimes are referred to as the Intercontinental Group of Companies.

 Intercontinental Securities Limited
 Intercontinental Bank Ghana Limited
 Intercontinental Finance and Investments Limited
 Intercontinental Bank United Kingdom plc
 Intercontinental Homes Savings and Loans Limited
 Intercontinental Registrars Limited
 Intercontinental Capital Markets Limited
 Intercontinental Wapic Insurance plc
 Intercontinental Properties Limited
 Intercontinental Trustees Limited

Governance
The Chairman of the Board was Raymond C. Obieri, while the Managing Director and Chief Executive Officer was Mahmud Lai Alabi.

External links
 Website of Access Bank plc
 Website of Central Bank of Nigeria

See also

 List of banks in Nigeria
 Central Bank of Nigeria
 Economy of Nigeria

References

Banks of Nigeria
Companies based in Lagos
Banks established in 1989
2013 mergers and acquisitions